Hammond Glacier is located on the northeast side of the Haines Mountains, flowing northwest for about  to Sulzberger Ice Shelf in the Ford Ranges of Marie Byrd Land, Antarctica. It was discovered in 1934 by the Byrd Antarctic Expedition, and named by Richard E. Byrd for John Hays Hammond, an American mining engineer and philanthropist.

See also
 List of glaciers in the Antarctic
 Glaciology

References

Glaciers of Marie Byrd Land